Honeysuckle Susan Weeks (born 1 August 1979) is a British actress best known for her role as Samantha Stewart (later Wainwright) in the ITV wartime drama series Foyle's War.

Early life
Weeks was born in Cardiff, Wales, to Robin and Susan (née Wade) Weeks, and grew up in Chichester and Petworth, both in West Sussex, England. Her parents named her after the plant honeysuckle, because its flowers were in bloom when she was born. She has a younger sister Perdita and brother Rollo, who have also pursued careers in acting.

Weeks was educated at Great Ballard School, Sussex, Roedean School and Pembroke College, Oxford, where she read English (graduating with upper-second class honours). She also spent time studying art on the John Hall Pre-university Course in Venice, Italy. As a child she was a member of the Chichester Festival Theatre. From the age of nine, Weeks studied at the Sylvia Young Theatre School at the weekends.

Aged 11, Weeks was flown to the United States and cast in the Walt Disney Pictures feature A Far Off Place being directed by Steven Spielberg. However, when Spielberg dropped out of the project, Weeks' role was re-cast with Reese Witherspoon.

Acting career

Television
Despite missing out on a film role, Weeks was cast in 1993 as the juvenile lead role of Kitty Killen in the television adaptation of Anne Fine's Goggle-Eyes in 1993. Her sister Perdita and brother Rollo also appeared with her in small roles in the third episode of that series. The part gained her considerable attention, and she was interviewed by Alan Titchmarsh on the TV show Pebble Mill about her role in the series. She quickly became a familiar face to viewers, appearing in a number of Ruth Rendell adaptations, such as A Dark-Adapted Eye (1994), and The Ruth Rendell Mysteries episodes The Strawberry Tree (1995) and The Orchid Walls (1998), while she had a notable role in The Bill in 1995, playing a kidnap victim in the feature length episode "Deadline", with David Tennant as her abductor.

In 1997, Honeysuckle and Perdita were both cast in Catherine Cookson's The Rag Nymph, wherein Perdita played the younger version of her sister's character. It was a significant role for Honeysuckle, and she gained further fame when she appeared in the children's TV series The Wild House that year, appearing from 1997 to 1998. She appeared in the raunchy BBC serial Close Relations in 1998 as she sought to move to more adult roles, and continued to receive regular acting work, such as in Midsomer Murders (1999). In 2002, she was cast as Samantha Stewart in the TV series Foyle's War a BAFTA Award–winning detective series set in Hastings during and just after World War II; she starred opposite Michael Kitchen and was featured in every episode of all eight series, which were broadcast between 2002 and 2015. It is the role she is most well-known for.

She continued to find other roles during this period. In 2006 she appeared in the Poirot mystery Cards on the Table, while in 2007, Weeks starred in The Inspector Lynley Mysteries as Tania Thompson, a character based on the Canadian serial killer Karla Homolka. In 2008, she appeared as Harriet Pringle in the Radio 4 adaptation of Fortunes of War. In 2012, she played a small part as Mrs Beeton in an episode of the BBC educational programme The Charles Dickens Show.

After Foyle's War ended in 2015, she appeared as Mae Harmer in the BBC TV series Death in Paradise (series 4), while in May that year, she portrayed a wartime letter writer at VE Day 70: A Party to Remember in Horse Guards Parade, London that was broadcast live on BBC1. She also appeared in the ITV series Lewis episode "Magnum Opus". The following year she appeared in the TV series The Five as Laura Marshall, before personal events saw her take a break from acting for the next 3 years.

In 2019, Weeks guest starred in an episode of Frankie Drake Mysteries as author Agatha Christie. It was her first appearance back on screen in three years, and she followed it up with an appearance in the Channel 4 series Maxxx in the episode House Party.

Film
Weeks has appeared as Annie Ridd in the TV movie Lorna Doone in 2000, and Sarah in My Brother Tom in 2001. In 2005 she was cast as Clarissa in Red Mercury, but her most daring role was in The Wicker Tree (the "spiritual successor" to The Wicker Man) in 2011, where she had to appear nude in a number of scenes for the first time in her career.

Stage acting
In early 2010, Weeks appeared as "Sarah Prentice" in a production of the Agatha Christie play A Daughter's A Daughter at London's Trafalgar Studios. Later that year, Weeks appeared as Eliza Doolittle in a production of Pygmalion at the Chichester Festival Theatre in West Sussex.

She starred in the UK premiere of Melanie Marnich's play These Shining Lives from 8 May to 9 June 2013.

In 2018, she starred as Mabel Cantwell in Gore Vidal's play The Best Man on the West End.

Personal life
Weeks admitted in an 2013 interview that she used to be a bit of a wild child when she was younger. "I was a hippie, let's put it that way," she said. "All that free love went on at university and smoking things one shouldn't, but if you don't do it when you are young..." However, she said that she has settled down since she had children. "I used to be quite a wild thing, but motherhood has tamed me," she added.

Weeks was engaged to the poet and musician Anno Birkin for a short period before his death, at age 20, in a car crash in Italy in 2001. She married hypnotherapist Lorne Stormonth-Darling, of a landed gentry family of Lednathie, Kirriemuir, Scotland, in an impromptu Buddhist wedding ceremony while on holiday in the Himalayas in 2005, followed by a London wedding in July 2007. The couple have one child born in 2011 and live in Petworth.

In August 2015, Weeks was caught speeding on the A3 in south-west London. It later emerged that she was already banned from driving under the totting-up scheme, due to points violations, and in early 2016 was ordered to wear an electronic tag when the court imposed a four-week night time curfew on her.

In July 2016, it was reported that Weeks had gone missing, with relatives said to be concerned for her welfare. However, she was later found safe and well and remained with police late that night before returning to West Sussex. In January 2023, Weeks was again banned from driving, this time following an incident in which she reversed into a parked vehicle whilst more than twice the legal limit for alcohol.

In a 2010 interview for the Sunday Mercury, Weeks said that she was a vegetarian.

Awards and nominations
In 2004, Weeks was nominated in the Most Popular Newcomer category at the National Television Awards, despite having been acting since 1993.

Filmography

References

External links
 

1979 births
Living people
Alumni of Pembroke College, Oxford
British film actresses
British radio actresses
British stage actresses
British television actresses
British Shakespearean actresses
People educated at Roedean School, East Sussex
Actresses from Cardiff
People from Chichester
People educated at Great Ballard School
21st-century British actresses
20th-century British actresses
British child actresses
Formerly missing people
Alumni of the Sylvia Young Theatre School